Guillermo Alder (born 16 September 1971) is an Argentine cross-country skier. He competed in the men's 10 kilometre classical event at the 1992 Winter Olympics. He is brother of Inés Alder.

References

External links
 

1971 births
Living people
Argentine male cross-country skiers
Olympic cross-country skiers of Argentina
Cross-country skiers at the 1992 Winter Olympics